José Zacarías Antonio Beletzuy (born 15 March 1982) is a Guatemalan football midfielder who currently plays for Deportivo Coatepeque of the Guatemalan second division.

Club career
Antonio enjoyed successes with Xelajú MC, winning the 2006/2007 Clausura, before joining Coatepeque in 2009.

International career
He made his debut for Guatemala in a July 2003 CONCACAF Gold Cup Finals match against Jamaica and has earned a total of 17 caps. He has represented his country in 1 FIFA World Cup qualification match and played at the 2005 UNCAF Nations Cup the 2003 and the 2005

His most recent international was a July 2005 Gold Cup match against South Africa.

References

External links

1982 births
Living people
Sportspeople from Guatemala City
Guatemalan footballers
Guatemala international footballers
2003 CONCACAF Gold Cup players
2005 UNCAF Nations Cup players
2005 CONCACAF Gold Cup players
Xelajú MC players

Association football midfielders